Thrasher Shiver is the only album by the American country music duo Thrasher Shiver, which was composed of singer-songwriters Neil Thrasher and Kelly Shiver. Their only album, it was issued in 1996 on Asylum Records. Two singles were released from it: "Goin' Goin' Gone" and "Be Honest", which respectively reached #65 and #49 on the Billboard Hot Country Singles & Tracks (now Hot Country Songs) charts. Thrasher Shiver produced the album along with Justin Niebank, while Archie Jordan also co-produced "Be Honest". "Between the Stones and Jones" was previously recorded by Daron Norwood on his 1995 album Ready, Willing and Able, and "Closer" was later recorded by the Canadian band Jo Hikk on its 2008 debut album Ride. After this album's release, Thrasher and Shiver parted ways, and Thrasher has since become a songwriter for other artists.

Critical reception
Giving it three stars out of five, Thom Jurek of Allmusic called it "polished but impassioned country-rock that touches on honky tonk, barroom weepers and modern country barn-burners" but said that the duo "sometimes suffers from trying to hard to avoid Nashville clichés." Chuck Hamilton of Country Standard Time praised the duo's vocal harmonies and called "All the King's Horses" the countriest-sounding cut, but added, "Obviously Thrasher and Shiver have more talent than the run of the mill hunks with hats. Maybe next time, the suits will let them show more of it."

Track listing
"Goin' Goin' Gone" (Neil Thrasher, Michael Dulaney) - 4:31
"All the King's Horses" (Jess Leary, Jody Alan Sweet) - 3:16
"Closer" (Thrasher, Kim Williams, Kent Blazy) - 3:26
"You and I Belong" (Buddy Mondlock, Reeva Hunter) - 3:45
"She's the Only One" (Mary Jordan, Allyson Taylor) - 4:14
"Run Like the Wind" (Roger Alan Wade, Dennis Knutson) - 3:33
"Tragedy" (Thrasher, Blazy) - 3:41
"Between the Stones and Jones" (Williams, Cyril Rawson, Kim Tribble) - 3:08
"The Rails" (Thrasher, Kelly Shiver, John Greenebaum) - 4:33
"That's My Girl" (Thrasher, Shiver, Blazy) - 3:53
"Be Honest" (Shiver, Archie Jordan) - 3:16

Personnel
As listed in liner notes.

Thrasher Shiver
Kelly Shiver – vocals, acoustic guitar on "Be Honest"
Neil Thrasher – vocals

Additional musicians
Larry Byrom – acoustic guitar
Shannon Forrest – drums
Larry Franklin – fiddle
Justin Niebank – keyboards on "Tragedy"
Russ Pahl – acoustic guitar, steel guitar, Dobro
Don Potter – acoustic guitar and Dobro on "Be Honest"
Michael Rhodes – bass guitar
Matt Rollings – piano ,organ
Steuart Smith – electric guitar

String section on "Be Honest"
Carl Gorodetzky – violin
Jim Grosjean – viola
Bob Mason – cello
Pamela Sixfin – violin

References

1996 debut albums
Asylum Records albums
Thrasher Shiver albums